Tulip Drive is the third studio album by American country music artist Jimmie Allen, released June 24, 2022 via Stoney Creek Records/BBR Music Group.

Background 
"Down Home" was the first single released from the album.  Co-written by Tate Howell, Rian Ball, and Cameron Bedell, the song is about Allen's father. "Down Home" has made the Country Airplay chart. Allen announced the album's release in May 2022, and indicated that it would contain collaborations with Jennifer Lopez and CeeLo Green. According to an interview with CMT, Allen considered every track to be reflective of a personal experience in his life. The last track, "You Won't Be Alone", features Allen's son Aadyn.

Critical reception 
Buddy Iahn of The Music Universe stated that "the album’s title is deeply personal to Allen’s family ties – Tulip Drive is the name of the street his late grandmother grew up on".

Stephen Thomas Erlewine of AllMusic rated the album three stars out of five, stating that "generally, Tulip Drive is operating on cruise control on a suburban street: it's a smooth ride but kind of dull."

Track listing

Personnel 
Adapted from the album's liner notes.

Musicians
Jimmie Allen – lead vocals, background vocals
Cary Barlowe – electric guitar
Joel Castillo – background vocals
David Cohen – keys
Chris Daniel – drum programming
David Dorn – piano, keys, synth, B3 organ, keyboards
Jason Evigan – keyboards, guitar
Jesse Frasure – keyboards, bass, drums, programming
CeeLo Green – vocals, background vocals 
Lee Hendricks – bass guitar
Keith Hetrick – all instruments 
Mark Hill – bass guitar
Evan Hutchings – drums, digital programming, percussion
Vic Martin – background vocals
Justin Ostrander – electric guitar
Sol Philcox – electric guitar
Mark Prentice – electric guitar
Adam Shoenfeld – electric guitar
Gian Stone – background vocals
T-Pain – vocals, background vocals 
Eric Torres – acoustic guitar, background vocals
Ilya Toshinsky – acoustic guitar, electric guitar, mandolin, banjo

Production
Jim Cooley – mixing 
Vinny Venditto – mixing, engineering 
Jeff Gunnell – mixing 
Trevor Muzzy – mixing, vocal production 
Eric Torres – mixing 
Adam Ayan – mastering 
Andrew Mendelson – mastering
Eric Torres – engineering 
Jason Evigan – engineering, vocal production 
Gian Stone – engineering, programming, vocal production 
Jesse Frasure – engineering 
Evan Hutchings – engineering

Artwork
Anthony Depree – album design

References 

2022 albums
Albums produced by Jason Evigan
Albums produced by Jesse Frasure
BBR Music Group albums
Jimmie Allen albums